Matthias Wißhofer (also Wieshofer, Wießhofer, Wishofer and Wisshofer; 1752, Kössen - 23 September 1819, St. Johann in Tirol) was an Austrian freedom fighter, clergyman and pastor. He also served as the first school inspector for the Tyrolean Unterland. In addition, he was an amateur inventor, and is said to have devised an "electric shotgun".

Biography 
He was one of twelve children born to Matthias Wisshofer; a wainwright.

From 1781, he was Coadjutor Bishop in Hopfgarten im Brixental. During that time, he was also employed as Imperial  for Rattenberg, Kufstein and Kitzbühel. After 1783, he was the Dechant (Dean) in St. Johann.

He was sentenced to death by hanging. At the last moment, he received a pardon from the commander of the French forces, General François-Joseph Lefebvre.

To mark the centenary of the Tyrolean resistance, a monument to Wißhofer him was constructed on St. Johann's main square. It was cast in bronze from a design by Norbert Pfretzschner, and placed on a marble plinth which serves as a fountain. The base in inscribed "Erretter aus Feindesnot" (roughly, Savior from Enemy Persecution, after Psalm 7)

References

Further reading 
 Hannes Hofinger (Ed.): Mathias Wishofer – der treue Seelenhirt von St. Johann., reprint of a brochure from 1908, St. Johann in Tirol, 2003.
 August Scherer: Geographie und Geschichte von Tirol und Vorarlberg. Ed.by Alois Menghin, 6th ed., Innsbruck 1903.
 Hans Wirtenberger: Der ungewöhnliche Held von 1809. Zwischen Kaiser, Kalkstein und Horn, Heimatkundliche Beiträge des Museums- und Kulturvereines Sankt Johann in Tirol, #13, 2009 (PDF)

External links 
 Dechant Matthias Wieshofer @ Wintersteller Bataillons

1752 births
1819 deaths
Austrian clergy
Christian religious leaders
Austrian Catholics
People from Kitzbühel District